Coli Saco (born 15 May 2002) is a French professional footballer who plays as a midfielder for Serie C Group A club Pro Vercelli, on loan from Napoli.

Club career 

Born in Créteil, Saco joined Le Havre's youth sector in 2017, aged 15, before moving to Sochaux one year later. He then came through the youth ranks of the Lionceaux, taking part in the 2019–20 Coupe Gambardella, where Sochaux reached the round of 16 before the competition was cancelled, due to the emergency caused by the COVID-19 pandemic.

In October 2020, Saco entered AC Milan's academy; however, he was released after just one season, having not managed to break into the under-19 team consistently. In September 2021, he officially joined fellow Italian club Napoli after a successful trial.

Having impressed with his performances for Napoli's under-19 squad, during the 2021–22 season Saco started training with the first team, under manager Luciano Spalletti. The midfielder originally received his first official call-up to the senior team for a Serie A match against Juventus on 6 January 2022: however, having tested positive for COVID-19, he eventually had to withdraw from the match-day squad.

On 15 July 2022, Saco joined Serie C side Pro Vercelli on a season-long loan. He then made his professional debut for the club on 3 September, starting and playing 90 minutes in a 1–0 league win against Padova. On 5 November, he scored his first professional goal in a 1–3 league loss against AlbinoLeffe.

Style of play 

Saco is a left-footed midfielder, who has been mainly regarded for his physical attributes, which allow him to win a good amount of headers and keep possession. Despite his slow pace, he has proved to have good abilities in reading the game and finding goal opportunities, thanks to his off-the-ball movement and his heading. He has also been noticed for his vision and his long-range passing prowess.

Although he has been compared to André-Frank Zambo Anguissa, he cited Paul Pogba and Yaya Touré as his main sources of inspiration.

Personal life 

Saco is of Malian descent.

Career statistics

Club

References

External links 

 
 

2002 births
Living people
French footballers
French people of Malian descent
Association football midfielders
Serie C players
Le Havre AC players
FC Sochaux-Montbéliard players
A.C. Milan players
S.S.C. Napoli players
F.C. Pro Vercelli 1892 players
French expatriate footballers
Expatriate footballers in Italy
French expatriate sportspeople in Italy